The Beacon Park Open a men's grass court tennis tournament staged only one time in October 1880. The open tournament was organised by the Beacon Park Athletic Association, and played at Beacon Park, Boston, Massachusetts, United States.

History 
The Beacon Park tournament was a grass court tennis event organised by the Boston Athletic Assoctiation, and played in October 1880. It is notable for being the first challenge cup tournament to be staged in the United States.

A description of the tournament that took place in Badminton Library of Sports and Pastimes 1890:

References

Defunct tennis tournaments in the United States
Grass court tennis tournaments